Arthur Edward Holland Grey Egerton, 3rd Earl of Wilton (25 November 1833 – 18 January 1885), styled Viscount Grey de Wilton from 1833 to 1882, was a British peer and Conservative Member of Parliament from the Egerton family.

Wilton was the third but eldest surviving son of Thomas Egerton, 2nd Earl of Wilton and his first wife Lady Mary Stanley, daughter of Edward Smith-Stanley, 12th Earl of Derby.

He was educated at Eton and Christ Church, Oxford and was elected to Parliament for Weymouth in 1859, a seat he held until 1865, and also represented Bath between 1873 and 1874.

In 1875, seven years before he succeeded his father in the earldom, he was raised to the peerage as Baron Grey de Radcliffe, in the County Palatine of Lancaster.

Lord Wilton married Lady Elizabeth Charlotte Louisa Craven, daughter of William Craven, 2nd Earl of Craven, in 1858. The marriage was childless. Lord Wilton died in January 1885, aged 51. On his death the barony of Grey de Radcliffe became extinct while he was succeeded in the earldom by his younger brother Seymour John Grey Egerton.

References

External links 
 

1833 births
1885 deaths
Earls in the Peerage of the United Kingdom
Conservative Party (UK) MPs for English constituencies
UK MPs 1859–1865
UK MPs 1868–1874
UK MPs who inherited peerages
UK MPs who were granted peerages
Arthur
People educated at Eton College
Alumni of Christ Church, Oxford
Peers of the United Kingdom created by Queen Victoria
Hulme Trust